Legendary is the twentieth studio album by American rapper Z-Ro, released on November 11, 2016 under 1 Deep Entertainment and was distributed by EMPIRE. The album features guest appearances from Mike D and Just Brittany.

Track listing

Notes
 All songs mixed by James Hoover at Hoover Sound Studio
 All songs mastered by James Hoover at Hoover Sound Studio
 Pressed By Disc Makers
 Management by Darryl Gooden

Charts

References

2016 albums
Z-Ro albums